The Women's War may refer to:

The Women's War (film) (German: Der Weiberkrieg), a 1928 German silent film directed by Franz Seitz 
The Women's War (novel), modern English translation title of novel La guerre des femmes by Dumas
The Women's War (podcast), podcast by conflict journalist Robert Evans about Rojava
Women's War, local Igbo name for the 1929 protests called the Aba Riots by the British